EleKtrik: Live in Japan is a live album by the band King Crimson, released in 2003. It consists of most of the audio soundtrack from the first disc of the band's double DVD Eyes Wide Open.

Track listing
"Introductory Soundscape" (Robert Fripp) – 5:05
"The Power to Believe (Part I: A Cappella)" (Adrian Belew) – 0:41
"Level Five" (Belew, Fripp, Trey Gunn, Pat Mastelotto) –  7:22
"ProzaKc Blues" (Belew, Fripp, Gunn, Mastelotto) – 5:59
"Elektrik" (Belew, Fripp, Gunn, Mastelotto) – 8:01
"Happy with What You Have to Be Happy With" (Belew, Fripp, Gunn, Mastelotto) – 4:14
"One Time" (Belew, Bill Bruford, Fripp, Gunn, Tony Levin, Mastelotto) – 6:00
"Facts of Life" (Belew, Fripp, Gunn, Mastelotto) – 5:29
"The Power to Believe (Part II: Power Circle)" (Belew, Fripp, Gunn, Mastelotto) – 8:43
"Dangerous Curves" (Belew, Fripp, Gunn, Mastelotto) – 6:02
"Larks' Tongues in Aspic (Part IV)" (Belew, Fripp, Gunn, Mastelotto) – 10:32
including:
"Coda: I Have a Dream"
"The World's My Oyster Soup Kitchen Floor Wax Museum" (Belew, Fripp, Gunn, Mastelotto) – 6:31

Personnel
Robert Fripp – guitar
Adrian Belew – guitar, vocals
Trey Gunn – Warr guitar
Pat Mastelotto – acoustic/electronic drums & percussion, drum programming

References

2003 live albums
King Crimson live albums
Discipline Global Mobile albums